Hypatopa tapadulcea is a moth in the family Blastobasidae. It is found in Costa Rica.

The length of the forewings is about 5 mm. The forewings are brown and the hindwings are grey.

References

Moths described in 1999
Hypatopa